Kwaku Fortune is an Irish actor.

Early life and education
Fortune is from Roundwood, County Wicklow. He is of Ghanaian descent on his mother's side. He graduated with a bachelor's degree in Acting from The Lir Academy at Trinity College Dublin in 2017.

Career
Fortune's early work includes roles in various short films and the main role of Tobi in 2011 RTÉ miniseries The Importance of Being Whatever.

Post-graduation from The Lir, Fortune landed the role of Finn in 2017 film Kissing Candice. He then made his stage debut with Playboyz, a modern interpretation and version of J.M. Synge's The Playboy of the Western World, which featured in the 2017 Dublin Theatre Festival.

In 2018, Fortune took part in On Raftery's Hill and a stage adaptation of the novel Asking For It by Louise O'Neill.

Fortune was on the Diversity on Screen panel at the 2019 Dublin International Film Festival. Fortune played the role of Julian in Sophie Hyde directed 2019 film Animals. That same year, Fortune narrated the perspective of Leon in an audiobook of The Flatshare by Beth O'Leary alongside Carrie Hope Fletcher for Macmillan Audio. Theatre-wise, Fortune reprised his role in Asking For It as well as starring in Peat and They Float Up.

Filmography

Film

Television

Stage

Audio

References

External links

Living people
21st-century Irish male actors
Alumni of Trinity College Dublin
Black Irish people
Irish male film actors
Irish male stage actors
Male actors from County Wicklow
Irish people of Ghanaian descent
People from County Wicklow
Year of birth missing (living people)